Shola Aur Shabnam is a 1992 Indian Hindi-language action romantic comedy film directed and edited by David Dhawan and written by Anees Bazmee, Rajeev Kaul and Praful Parekh. It stars Govinda and Divya Bharti, with Gulshan Grover, Alok Nath, Mohnish Behl, Bindu and Anupam Kher. The film revolves around the travails of a NCC student Karan (Govinda).

Initially titled Khiladi, the film was meant to be the debut film of Divya Bharti. But it was delayed owing to censorship problems. Siba Mishra handled the cinematography, while David Dhawan directed as well as edited the film. Anees Bazmee, Praful Parekh and Rajiv Kaul penned the screenplay. Bappi Lahiri composed the music. It was distributed by Nihalani's banner, Chiragdeep International.

The film received favourable reviews upon release, and was a success, with critical praise drawn towards the performance of Govinda. Anupam Kher received acclaim for his portrayal of Major I. M. Lathi, and was nominated for Best Comic Actor at the 38th Filmfare Awards.

Plot
The spoiled and arrogant brother, Bali (Mohnish Behl), of notorious gangster, Kali Baba (Gulshan Grover), enlists in the National Cadet Corp, and wants to have his way with his fellow-students and trainer, Inder Mohan Lathi (Anupam Kher), with comical results. When he meets Divya Thapa (Divya Bharti) for the first time, he is smitten by her, and wants to be with her by hook or by crook. But Divya is in love with Karan (Govinda), and both plan to be with each other. Circumstances act against them, and they flee together, with Kali Baba's men, and Divya's Police Commissioner dad, Yashpal Thapa (Alok Nath), in hot pursuit, to an unknown destination, surrounded by a web of lies, deception, and no known resource to assist them.

Casting

Govinda Ahuja as Karan
Divya Bharti as Divya Thapa
Gulshan Grover as Kali Shankar
Mohnish Behl as Baali, Kali's brother
Anupam Kher as Major Inder Mohan Lathi / I.M. Lathi
Raja Bundela as Raja
Satyajeet as Satya (credited as Satyajit)
Girish Malik as Girish (credited as Girish Mallic)
Bindu as Girl's hostel principal
Alok Nath as Police commissioner Yashpal Thapa
Anil Dhawan as Assistant to police commissioner Thapa
Mahavir Shah as Police inspector Mahadev
Govind Namdeo as Police inspector Tiwari
Sudha Chandran as Rama, Karan's sister
Harish Patel as Velji, Kali's brother-in-law
Guddi Maruti as Guddi, Divya's friend
Reema Lagoo as Sharda Thapa
Madhu Kambikar as Karan's mother
Shakti Kapoor as Boxer Deva (special appearance)
Archana Puran Singh as Boxer Deva's wife
Mac Mohan as Jaichand
Sudhir as Brij, Jaichand's partner

Soundtrack

The music of the film was composed by Bappi Lahiri. It consisted of five songs. The music was released on the Venus Music label. Lyrics were penned by Anjaan and Govinda.

Track listing

Release

Box office  
Shola Aur Shabnam released on 31 January 1992. It was a blockbuster, eventually becoming one of the highest-grossers in the career of Govinda. It grossed 10.7crore (US$9.3 million) against a minimal budget of 3crore. Adjusted for inflation, its box office gross is equal to 70crore as of 2020.

Reception 

The film received mixed reviews upon release. Sukanya Verma from Rediff.com praised the performances of Govinda, Bharti and Kher, but was critical to its story which she addressed to be a "comic-romantic-potboiler" and that in the film "logic is entirely tossed out of the window". Rachit Gupta from Filmfare was appreciative of Divya, stating that she "seemed at ease switching between comedy and romance as she matched Govinda step to step". He also deemed the scenes of conflict between NCC cadet boys headed by Govinda and girl guides headed by Divya as "particularly memorable".

Awards 
38th Filmfare Awards:

Nominated
Best Comic Actor - Anupam Kher

Notes

References

1990s Hindi-language films
1992 films
Films directed by David Dhawan
1990s masala films
Indian romantic drama films
Indian action drama films
Films scored by Bappi Lahiri
Cross-dressing in Indian films
1990s action drama films
1992 romantic drama films